Ivo Corrado Casalini (born November 2, 1914 in Bologna) was an Italian professional football player.

1914 births
Year of death missing
Italian footballers
Serie A players
A.C. Prato players
A.C.N. Siena 1904 players
Juventus F.C. players
F.C. Pro Vercelli 1892 players
A.C. Cuneo 1905 players
Association football midfielders